Aminu Maigari is a Nigerian football administrator who served as the 38th President of the Nigeria Football Federation from 2010–2014 following his sack on the grounds of “financial misappropriation, misapplication and maladministration”.

References

Living people
Nigerian sports executives and administrators
Year of birth missing (living people)